Tietze:
 Tietze extension theorem
 Tietze's graph
 Tietze syndrome in medicine, named after Alexander Tietze
 Tietze transformation in mathematics, named after Heinrich Tietze
 Tietze, Tieze as German surnames